Zohar Zalman Strauss (born 4 March 1972 in Haifa) is an Israeli theater, film, and television actor.

Biography
Strauss was born in Haifa, Israel, to a secular Jewish  family of Ashkenazi Jewish descent.

He won the Award for Best Actor in the 2009 Jerusalem Film Festival for his appearance in Eyes Wide Open, and the 2009 Ophir Award for Best Supporting Actor for his performance in the film Lebanon. He was nominated for the same prize in 2006 and 2012, in recognition of his roles in Things Behind the Sun and Magic Men. He also won the ASSITEJ-Israel Award for Best Actor for the 2009/10 theater season.

Strauss earned a law degree from the University of Leicester but chose to become an actor, graduating from the Yoram Levinstein Studio in Tel Aviv in 2001. He debuted on the stage of the Herzliya Ensemble Theater and also performed in Habima Theatre. He won praise in 2010, when the Be'er Sheva Theater's staging of One Flew Over the Cuckoo's Nest, at which he portrayed Randle McMurphy, won the Israel Theater Award. He also appeared in a variety of film and television productions, including Beaufort, Jellyfish, Kirot, Srugim, and Zaguri Imperia.

Strauss portrayed ultra-Orthodox husband, father, gentle-spirit, and conflicted soul Lippe Weiss in the award-winning Israeli drama Shtisel, which is available in the United States on Netflix. The series premiered in 2013, with the third season broadcast in 2021.

In 2018, Strauss appeared as John the Apostle in Mary Magdalene, written by Helen Edmundson and directed by Garth Davis.

Selected filmography

References

External links
 

1972 births
Living people
Israeli male stage actors
Israeli male film actors
Israeli male television actors
Survivor (Israeli TV series) contestants
Male actors from Haifa
Ophir Award Winners